Kocuria carniphila is a species of bacteria in the genus Kocuria. It was first isolated from meat.

Etymology 
Its name comes from the Latin word caro, meaning "meat" combined with either the Latin word phila or the Ancient Greek word philê (φίλη), both of which mean "loving".

References 

Micrococcaceae
Bacteria described in 2005